Mulawin is a Philippine television drama fantasy series broadcast by GMA Network. Directed by Don Michael Perez and Dode Cruz, it stars Richard Gutierrez, Angel Locsin and Dennis Trillo. It premiered on August 2, 2004 on the network's Telebabad line up. The series concluded on March 18, 2005 with a total of 166 episodes. It was replaced by Darna in its timeslot.

The success of the series led to television spin-offs: Encantadia in 2005 and Iglot in 2011. While continuations of the series, the film Mulawin: The Movie was released in 2005 and the television series Mulawin vs. Ravena was broadcast in 2017.

The series is streaming online on YouTube.

Premise
The story centers around the species called "Mulawin" who once helped the humans save mother nature, they excluded themselves and hid in the mountains due to humanity's greed; while a rebel band of Mulawins called "Ravena" sought revenge against the humans. The peace between the humans and Mulawins lies in Aguiluz, the protector and Alwina, the envoy.

Cast and characters

Lead cast
 Richard Gutierrez as Aguiluz / Aguilar
 Angel Locsin as Alwina
 Dennis Trillo as Gabriel

Supporting cast
 Ara Mina as Vultra / Violeta / Veronica
 Gary Estrada as Rasmus
 Amy Austria as Lourdes
 Zoren Legaspi as Bagwis
 Romnick Sarmenta as Habagat
 Lloyd Samartino as Lucio Montenegro
 Karen delos Reyes as Savannah Montenegro
 Bearwin Meily as Kuwak / Makisig
 Bryan Revilla as Lino
 Pia Pilapil as Lucila Montenegro
 Marissa Sanchez as Tuka
 Alicia Alonzo as Rosing
 Kiel Rogriduez as Terong
 Bianca King as Aviona
 Jaja Bolivar as Biba
 Happy Lynn Sy as Yolly
 Eddie Gutierrez as Dakila

Recurring cast
 Miguel Tanfelix as Pagaspas / Gas
 Sam Bumatay as Lawiswis / Wis
 Tricia Roman as Pamela
 Michael de Mesa as Ravenum

Guest cast
 Kurt Perez as young Aguiluz
 Kristel Fulgar as young Alwina
 Paul Salas as young Gabriel
 Shamel Leask as young Aviona
 Eunice Lagusad as young Biba
 Carmina Villaroel as Ina / Salimbay
 Tanya Garcia as Paloma
 Isabella de Leon as Mayi
 Rainier Castillo as adult Pagaspas
 Denise Laurel as adult Lawiswis
 Eagle Riggs as Dak-dak
 Bidz dela Cruz as Ngas-ngas
 Sasi Casas as Gad-gad
 Ang-ang - Portrayed by
 Michael Roy Jornales as Kuskos
 Musmos - Portrayed by 
 Sakmal - Portrayed by 
 Jeff Carpio as Laab
 Hampas - Portrayed by 
 Procopio - Portrayed by 
 Bianca- Portrayed by 
 Princess Punzalan as Maningning
 Cristine Reyes as Estrea
 Shermaine Santiago as Oyayi
 Ehra Madrigal as Dalaginding
 Giselle Toengi as Ynang Reyna
 Sheryl Cruz as Linang
 Nancy Castiglione as Muyak
 James Blanco as Aramis
 Ian Veneracion as Panabon
 Bettina Carlos as Florona
 Katarina Perez as Banayad
 Mayumi - Portrayed by
 Daluyong - Portrayed by 
 Jay Aquitania as Mulagat
 Edwin Zarate as Lumbas
 Roi Vinzon as Daragit
 Balasik - Portrayed by 
 Geneva Cruz as Haraya
 Botchok - Portrayed by
 Ching ching - Portrayed by
 Caloy / Laki / Hidalgo

Sequels
A direct sequel to the series, the film Mulawin: The Movie was produced by Regal Entertainment and GMA Films and was released in theaters on December 25, 2005 as an entry to the 2005 Metro Manila Film Festival. A continuation of the film, the television series Mulawin vs. Ravena premiered on GMA Network on May 22, 2017.

Soundtrack
In October 2004, GMA Records released an album entitled Songs Inspired By Mulawin which serves as the series' original soundtrack. The album was made in response to several requests to play the show's theme song in various Philippine radio stations. The album includes the series' theme song "Ikaw Nga" by South Border.

Production
Actress Maxene Magalona was approached to play the role of Alwina, which she declined. The role was later given to Angel Locsin.

References

External links
 
 

Mulawin
2004 Philippine television series debuts
2005 Philippine television series endings
Fantaserye and telefantasya
Filipino-language television shows
GMA Network drama series
Television shows set in the Philippines